The 2012 Elimination Chamber (known as No Way Out in Germany) was the third Elimination Chamber professional wrestling pay-per-view (PPV) event produced by WWE. It took place on February 19, 2012, at the Bradley Center in Milwaukee, Wisconsin.

Six matches were contested at the event, five of which were broadcast on the pay-per-view while the other was a dark match. In the main event, John Cena defeated Kane in an Ambulance match. There were two matches contested inside the Elimination Chamber. In the first, which opened the show, CM Punk defeated The Miz, Chris Jericho, Kofi Kingston, Dolph Ziggler, and R-Truth to retain the WWE Championship, while in the second, Daniel Bryan defeated Santino Marella, Wade Barrett, Cody Rhodes, Big Show, and The Great Khali to retain the World Heavyweight Championship.

The event garnered 178,000 pay-per-view buys, down from 199,000 buys the previous year's event received.

Production

Background
Elimination Chamber is a gimmick pay-per-view, produced every February by WWE since 2010—in April 2011, the promotion ceased going by its full name of World Wrestling Entertainment, with "WWE" becoming an orphaned initialism. The concept of the show is that one or two main event matches are contested inside the Elimination Chamber, either with championships or future opportunities at championships at stake. The 2012 event was the third event under the Elimination Chamber chronology and the first to be held since the end of the first brand split in August 2011. The event was scheduled to be held on February 19, 2012, at the Bradley Center in Milwaukee, Wisconsin.

The previous year, the show was promoted as "No Escape" in Germany as it was feared that the name "Elimination Chamber" may remind people of the gas chambers used during the Holocaust. For the 2012 event, the show was promoted as "No Way Out."

Storylines
Elimination Chamber featured professional wrestling matches that involved different wrestlers from pre-existing scripted feuds, plots, and storylines that were played out on Raw, SmackDown, and WWE Superstars—WWE's television programs. Wrestlers portrayed heroes or villains as they followed a series of events that built tension, and culminated in a wrestling match or series of matches.

The first match was announced by Interim Raw General Manager John Laurinaitis on January 30 on WWE's website featuring WWE Champion CM Punk defending his title against Dolph Ziggler, Chris Jericho, The Miz, R-Truth, and Kofi Kingston. The following week on Raw, Jericho won a Six-Pack Challenge featuring all six Elimination Chamber participants to earn the right to enter the match last.

On the February 3 episode of SmackDown, it was announced by SmackDown General Manager Theodore Long that there would also be an Elimination Chamber match for the World Heavyweight Championship originally featuring Daniel Bryan defending his title against Cody Rhodes, Wade Barrett, Big Show, Mark Henry and Randy Orton. The same night as the announcement, Henry would be removed from the match and suspended indefinitely by Long after he threatened him. Later in the night, The Great Khali was announced as Henry's replacement. On the February 13 episode of Raw, Orton suffered a legitimate concussion during a match, which was blamed in storyline by Bryan hitting him in the head with the title. On the February 17 episode of SmackDown, a battle royal was held to determine Orton's replacement, which was won by Santino Marella, enabling him to enter the match.

John Cena and Kane began feuding in December 2011, with Kane targeting Cena due to his T-shirt slogan, "Rise Above Hate". To play psychological games with Cena, Kane began targeting Cena's friend Zack Ryder and his on-screen girlfriend, Eve Torres, attacking Ryder and cornering Eve in a variety of situations, all in an effort to make Cena "embrace the hate." On the February 6 episode of Raw, an Ambulance match was announced for Elimination Chamber between Kane and Cena.

Event

Before the event aired live on pay-per-view, Hunico defeated Alex Riley in a dark match.

Preliminary matches
The first match to air on pay-per-view was the Elimination Chamber match between reigning champion CM Punk, Dolph Ziggler, Chris Jericho, Kofi Kingston, R-Truth and The Miz for the WWE Championship. Punk started off the match with Kingston. Punk sent Kingston into a pod and performed a Suplex on Kingston onto the chamber floor. Ziggler entered at #3, targeting Punk. R-Truth entered at #4, being eliminated by Punk after a diving elbow drop. Next was Miz followed by Jericho, who won the right to enter last after winning a Six-Pack Challenge on Raw. Jericho eliminated Ziggler after a Codebreaker and eliminated Kingston after forcing Kingston to submit to the Liontamer. Jericho was then knocked out after a roundhouse kick by Punk, leading to him falling out of the chamber (which had been opened to let Kingston out after he was eliminated) and accidentally landed on a camera man, thus being deemed unable to continue by the ringside trainers. Punk and Miz were the final two, after Punk kicked out of the Skull Crushing Finale, Punk performed a G.T.S. on Miz to score the final fall and retain his championship.

Next was the Divas Championship match between reigning champion Beth Phoenix and Tamina Snuka.  After a back-and forth-contest, Snuka would performed a Samoan drop to set up the Superfly Splash. Phoenix countered by superplexing Snuka from the top rope.  Snuka then scored a superkick-Superfly Splash combination to Phoenix, leading to a close near-fall.  Phoenix performed a Glam Slam on Snuka to score the pinfall and retain her title.

Next was the Elimination Chamber match between reigning champion Daniel Bryan, Big Show, The Great Khali, Cody Rhodes, Wade Barrett and Santino Marella for the World Heavyweight Championship. Barrett and Big Show were the first two in the ring, attacking one another. Rhodes entered at #3, who worked with Barrett for much of the match, attempting to slow down Big Show. Marella entered at #4, who immediately got attacked by Big Show. Khali entered at #5 and managed to dominate for a while but soon got speared by Show straight away and pinned. Show climbed Bryan's pod, ripping off the chains and attacking him. When Bryan got out, Rhodes and Barrett immediately attacked Show. After a DDT by Rhodes and a driving elbow drop from Barrett, Rhodes pinned and eliminated Big Show. Rhodes was eliminated by Marella after a roll-up. Barrett was eliminated by Marella, following a diving headbutt by Bryan. The final two were Bryan and Marella, who scored a close near-fall after performing The Cobra. Marella was shocked that Bryan had kicked out and while he was in shock, Bryan forced Marella to submit to the LeBell Lock, retaining his championship. After the match, Sheamus ran in and attacked Bryan in retaliation for Bryan spitting on him on the previous episode of SmackDown. This indicated that Sheamus had selected to challenge Bryan for the World Heavyweight Championship at WrestleMania XXVIII, which Sheamus won the right to do after his victory in the Royal Rumble match.

Next was an impromptu United States Championship match between Justin Gabriel (with Hornswoggle) and champion Jack Swagger (with Vickie Guerrero). Gabriel gave Swagger an intense challenge but Swagger eventually applied the Ankle lock and made Gabriel submit to retain the championship.

Main event
The main event was the Ambulance match between John Cena and Kane. They fought out of the ring for most of the match where Cena attacked Kane repeatedly with the steel ring steps. As he attempted to give Kane an Attitude Adjustment off the ring steps through the announce table, Kane countered and chokeslammed Cena through the table instead. With Cena down, Kane placed him onto a gurney and loaded him into the ambulance. Before Kane could shut the door, though, Cena fought his way out of the ambulance and took the fight to the top of the vehicle, where he finally finished off Kane with an Attitude Adjustment off the ambulance onto the equipment area. Cena then loaded Kane into the ambulance to score the victory.

Reception
The Canadian Online Explorer gave the event a mixed review with an overall rating of 5 out of 10. The Elimination Chamber matches were particularly praised, with the WWE Championship match given an 8 out of 10 rating and the World Heavyweight Championship match a 9 out of 10. In contrast, the United States Championship match was criticized as it "seemed to be shoehorned into the card" and was given a 2 out of 10. The Divas Championship match and the Ambulance match were given a 4 out of 10.

Results

Elimination Chamber entrances and eliminations (WWE Championship)

Elimination Chamber entrances and eliminations (World Heavyweight Championship)

References

External links
Official website

Events in Milwaukee
2012
2012 in Wisconsin
Professional wrestling in Milwaukee
2012 WWE pay-per-view events
February 2012 events in the United States

es:WWE Elimination Chamber#2012